Bruce Beemer (born December 14, 1968) is an American attorney and jurist serving as a judge on the Allegheny County Court of Common Pleas. He served as the 49th Pennsylvania Attorney General from 2016 to 2017 and as Inspector General of Pennsylvania from 2016 to 2019. He was nominated to the Allegheny County Court of Common Pleas by Governor Tom Wolf and unanimously confirmed by the Pennsylvania State Senate in November 2019. He was sworn in on January 3, 2020.

Education 
Beemer was born in Scranton, Pennsylvania. He attended Phillips Academy, graduating in 1987. In 1992, Beemer earned a Bachelor of Arts degree from the University of Scranton, before earning a Juris Doctor from the University of Pittsburgh School of Law in 1995.

Early career

Allegheny County District Attorney's Office 
Judge Beemer served as an assistant district attorney in the General Trial Unit, the Narcotics Unit, and the Crimes Against Persons Unit of the Allegheny County District Attorney's Office, prosecuting various types of cases, including DUIs, homicide, serious offenses involving drug delivery and trafficking, rape, child abuse, aggravated assault, robbery, burglary, and computer crimes. In 2005, Judge Beemer was promoted to deputy district attorney in charge of the General Trial Unit, where he supervised eighteen attorneys prosecuting roughly ten thousand cases a year ranging from weapons and drug violations, DUI, theft, forgery, burglary, robbery, and assault. Judge Beemer became the supervisor of both the Summary Appeals Unit and the Extradition Unit in 2006. In addition to his many supervisory roles, Judge Beemer continued to prosecute many homicides and other serious matters. He worked regularly with city, state, and federal law enforcement agents to identify and prosecute gang related criminal activity throughout the City of Pittsburgh and Allegheny County. He also spent considerable time investigating several cold case homicides.

Private Practice 
In 2010, Judge Beemer left the Allegheny County District Attorney's Office to join the law firm founded by his parents as a partner, opening a new Pittsburgh office. He brought federal and state criminal defense work to the firm, which had mostly represented plaintiffs in cases regarding environmental law, personal injury, and medical malpractice. He primarily focused on the representation of those harmed by environmental polluters. In partnership with two other firms in 2011, the firm represented several hundred plaintiffs in a class action against Sandvik Steel and other companies for toxic contamination at an industrial site near Scranton, resulting in the largest settlement of a mass tort environmental case in the history of northeast Pennsylvania.

Pennsylvania Office of the Attorney General 
In 2011, the attorney general of Pennsylvania asked Bruce to serve as her chief of staff, where he routinely consulted with the attorney general on high-level criminal cases, civil matters involving the representation of state government agencies, and large-scale consumer protection actions.

When a new attorney general assumed office in 2013, she appointed Judge Beemer to serve as senior counsel and chief of the Criminal Prosecutions Section. A champion in the fight against corruption, he oversaw a comprehensive investigation into systemic issues surrounding child abuse centered on conduct within the Altoona-Johnstown Diocese. While attorney general, he led an expansion of that investigation into other dioceses. He also managed investigations that led to the arrest and conviction of a former state senator for theft and conflict of interest, a former mayor of Harrisburg following an investigation into a failed attempt to finance an incinerator project, and investigations involving fraud and corruption at both the PA Turnpike and PENNDOT. As attorney general and first deputy, he helped to negotiate and implement a consent decree between UPMC and Highmark that protected the insurance coverage of hundreds of thousands of Pennsylvanians. He also oversaw lawsuits against electric generation suppliers for the over-billing of customers during a polar vortex, and a lawsuit against an energy company regarding misrepresentations made to landowners who entered into lease agreements.

49th Attorney General of Pennsylvania 
Following the resignation of the attorney general, Judge Beemer was nominated by the governor to serve as the 49th attorney general and fulfill the remainder of her term. He was confirmed unanimously by the Pennsylvania Senate by a vote of 44–0. During his tenure as Attorney General of Pennsylvania, Judge Beemer worked to restore the morale of the 800 attorneys and staff of the Office of the Attorney General and reestablished the office's partnerships with other local, state, and federal law enforcement agencies. He restored integrity of the office's leadership and worked to rebuild the public's trust. He also served as the vice-chair of the Pennsylvania Board of Pardons, working to make the pardons process more accessible to the citizens of the Commonwealth.

After the election of Attorney General Josh Shapiro, Judge Beemer resumed his role as Inspector General of Pennsylvania.

Inspector General of Pennsylvania 
In 2016, the governor appointed Judge Beemer to serve as Inspector General of Pennsylvania, where he was responsible for investigating waste, fraud and abuse within the executive branch agencies of state government, as well as welfare fraud, food stamp trafficking, and overpayment of benefits from inception to final prosecution or adjudication. He investigated cheating at the Pennsylvania State Police Academy, investigated the Department of Aging and its oversight of County Areas on Aging, and investigated the Department of Human Services’ oversight of county children and youth service agencies, while also saving close to $100 million in the last three years by identifying and preventing fraud in the public benefits system.

Allegheny County Court of Common Pleas 
Judge Beemer was appointed by the governor and confirmed unanimously by the Pennsylvania State Senate to the Allegheny County Court of Common Pleas in 2019. He currently serves in the Criminal Division, handling a specialty court docket in Sex Offender Court (SOC) dealing with crimes against minors. Judge Beemer has been rated Highly Recommended by the Allegheny County Bar Association Judiciary Committee.

References

21st-century American politicians
Pennsylvania state court judges
Politicians from Scranton, Pennsylvania
Pennsylvania Attorneys General
Pennsylvania Democrats
University of Pittsburgh School of Law alumni
University of Scranton alumni
Living people
1968 births